Elizabeth Paulet ( – 4 November 1576) was an English noblewoman, the daughter of John Paulet, 2nd Marquess of Winchester of Basing, Hampshire and his first wife Elizabeth Willoughby.

Marriages and issue
Elizabeth Paulet married twice.

First marriage 
She married firstly, around 28 November 1545, Sir William Courtenay, (c. 1529 – 26 September 1557), the son of George Courtenay, of Powderham, Devon and Catherine St. Leger and had a son and a daughter:
 Sir William Courtenay, (June 1553 – 24 June 1630), married firstly, around 18 January 1573, Elizabeth, daughter of Henry Manners, 2nd Earl of Rutland; secondly, Elizabeth, daughter of Sir George Sydenham of Combe Sydenham in Somerset and widow of Sir Francis Drake; thirdly, Jane, daughter of Robert Hill of Yarde, Somerset.
 Jane Courtenay, married, around 20 January 1573, as his first wife, Sir Nicholas Parker of Willingdon.

Sir William Courtenay died 29 September 1557 after the battle of St. Quentin in Picardy. His son and heir, William, was four years old. He bequeathed to his wife the life interest of a third of his property in Devon and to his daughter an annuity of £20 until she was 21, when she was to receive £1,000.

Second marriage 
She married secondly, after 1557, Sir Henry Ughtred (–1599), the son of Sir Anthony Ughtred, Governor of Jersey and Elizabeth Seymour, daughter of Sir John Seymour of Wulfhall, Savernake, Wiltshire and Margery Wentworth.

Death
Elizabeth died 4 November 1576 and was buried at St. Mary's Church, Basing, Hampshire. Henry Ughtred remarried after his wife's death, however the identity of his second wife is unknown. He died in Limerick in June 1599.

References

Bibliography 
  (subscription required)

External links 
 Elizabeth Paulet Family tree

1530s births
Year of birth uncertain
1576 deaths
16th-century English women
Elizabeth
Daughters of British marquesses
Burials at St. Mary's Church, Old Basing
People from Old Basing